Dancing with the Stars returned for a second series on 7 January 2018 on RTÉ One. Loraine Barry, Brian Redmond and Julian Benson returned to the judging panel for a second year, while Amanda Byram and Nicky Byrne also returned as hosts.

Sean Smullen did not return for this series, however all other professional dancers did. Sean was replaced by former Dancing with the Stars: Taniec z gwiazdami professional champion, Robert Rowiński.

The competition was won by Jake Carter alongside professional partner Karen Byrne.	

On 25 March 2018, RTÉ announced that it would return for a third series in 2019.

Couples
On 3 December 2017, it was confirmed that Deirdre O'Kane would compete in the series.
On 4 December 2017, it was revealed on RTÉ 2fm's Breakfast Republic that host, Bernard O'Shea, was the latest celebrity to confirmed to be taking part.
On 6 December 2017, in an interview with Ryan Tubridy on his breakfast show on RTÉ Radio 1, it was revealed that Maïa Dunphy would be taking part in the series. On 8 December 2017, Erin McGregor, Marty Morrissey and Norah Casey appeared on The Late Late Show confirming their participation, with the remaining five contestants being confirmed later in the show. On 20 December 2017, previously confirmed celebrity, Aoife Walsh, was forced to pull out of the show due to injury; she was replaced by Alannah Beirne.

Scoring chart

Red numbers indicate the couples with the lowest score for each week.
Green numbers indicate the couples with the highest score for each week.
 the couple eliminated that week
 the returning couple that was called forward and eventually last to be called safe, but was not necessarily in the bottom
 the returning couple that finished in the bottom two and competed in the Dance-Off
 the winning couple
 the runner-up couple

Average chart
This table only counts for single dances scored on a traditional 30-points scale. It does not include the Team Dance or Marathon scores.

Highest and lowest scoring performances
The highest and lowest performances in each dance according to the judges' scale are as follows.

Couples' highest and lowest scoring dances

Weekly scores and songs
Unless indicated otherwise, individual judges scores in the charts below (given in parentheses) are listed in this order from left to right: Brian Redmond, Loraine Barry, Julian Benson.

Week 1Individual judges scores in the charts below (given in parentheses) are listed in this order from left to right: Brian Redmond, Loraine Barry, Darren Bennett.Due to an illness, Darren Bennett filled in for Julian Benson.

Guest act: Series 1 champions, Aidan O'Mahony and Valeria Milova performing a Charleston to 'I Got a Woman'

 Running order (Men)

Week 2Individual judges scores in the charts below (given in parentheses) are listed in this order from left to right: Brian Redmond, Loraine Barry, Darren Bennett.Darren Bennett filled in for Julian Benson.

Guest act: Brendan Cole and Faye Huddleston performing a Rumba to 'Fields of Gold'
 Running order (Women)

Week 3
Julian Benson returned to the panel following a two-week absence.

 Running order

Week 4: Movie Week
 Running order

Week 5
 Running order

Week 6: Switch-Up Week
Guest act: Gavin James performing 'Hearts On Fire'
 Running order

Week 7
 Running order

Dance-Off
 Judges' votes to save
 Benson: Erin & Ryan
 Redmond: Erin & Ryan
 Barry: Did not vote, but would have voted to save Erin & RyanWeek 8: Guilty Pleasures Week
 Running order

Dance-Off
Judges' votes to save
 Benson: Alannah & Vitali
 Redmond: Alannah & Vitali
 Barry: Did not vote, but would have voted to save Alannah & VitaliWeek 9: Team Dance Week
After each couple performed their individual dance, all six couples were separated into two teams to perform a team dance to earn a higher individual scores.
Running order

Dance-Off
 Judges' votes to save
 Benson: Erin & Ryan
 Redmond: Erin & Ryan
 Barry: Did not vote, but would have voted to save Erin & RyanWeek 10: Broadway Week
Guest act: Joanne Clifton and the cast of Flashdance the Musical performing a routine to 'Flashdance... What a Feeling'
 Running order

Dance-Off
Judges' votes to save
Benson: Erin & Ryan
Redmond: Erin & Ryan
Barry: Did not vote, but would have voted to save Erin & RyanWeek 11: Semifinal
Guest act: Riverdance collaboration with the Dancing with the Stars professional dancers.The couples will perform two dances, the first being a song by an Irish artist to celebrate Saint Patrick's DayRunning order

Dance-OffFor the dance-off Jake & Karen chose to perform their Rumba, while Erin & Ryan chose their Samba.''

Judges’ votes to save
Benson: Jake & Karen
Redmond: Erin & Ryan
Barry: Jake & Karen

Week 12: The Final
Guest act: Picture This performing 'This Morning'.
Running order

Dance chart
 Highest scoring dance
 Lowest scoring dance
 No dance performed

References

External links
 Official website

Season 02
2018 Irish television seasons